The Golden Slipper Stakes is an Australian Turf Club Group 1 Thoroughbred horse race for two-year-old horses run over 1,200 metres on turf at set weights conditions, held at Rosehill Gardens Racecourse in Sydney, Australia. It is the premier two year old race in Australia and is the world's richest race for two-year-old Thoroughbreds. Prize money is A$5,000,000.

History
The first Golden Slipper Stakes took place in 1957 and was won by Todman, by Star Kingdom, who also sired the next four winners of the Golden Slipper. Star Kingdom bloodlines can still be found in many of today's winners. In 1986 it became the first race in New South Wales to have A$1 million in prize money.

From 2009 to 2014 the race was held on the first Saturday in April. In 2008 it was held in mid-April - four weeks after Easter in March. Prior to 2008, the race was held on the Saturday before Good Friday in conjunction with a series of races known as the Golden Slipper Carnival.

Distance
1957–1972 -  6 furlongs (~1200 metres)
1973 onwards - 1200 metres

Grade
1957–1978 -  Principal Race
1979 onwards - Group 1

Records
Trainers with most wins:
 Gai Waterhouse (7)
 T. J. Smith (6)
 Freedman brothers (Lee, Michael, Richard, Anthony) (5)
 Bart Cummings, Clarry Conners (4)

Jockeys with most wins:
 Shane Dye, Ron Quinton (4)
 Mick Dittman, Kevin Langby, Athol Mulley, Tommy Berry (3)

Winners

2023 - Shinzo
2022 - Fireburn
2021 - Stay Inside
2020 - Farnan
2019 - Kiamichi
2018 - Estijaab
2017 - She Will Reign
2016 - Capitalist
2015 - Vancouver
2014 - Mossfun
2013 - Overreach
2012 - Pierro
2011 - Sepoy
2010 - Crystal Lily
2009 - Phelan Ready
2008 - Sebring
2007 - Forensics
2006 - Miss Finland
2005 - Stratum
2004 - Dance Hero
2003 - Polar Success
2002 - Calaway Gal
2001 - Ha Ha
2000 - Belle Du Jour
1999 - Catbird
1998 - Prowl
1997 - Guineas
1996 - Merlene
1995 - Flying Spur
1994 - Danzero
1993 - Bint Marscay
1992 - Burst
1991 - Tierce
1990 - Canny Lad
1989 - Courtza
1988 - Star Watch
1987 - Marauding
1986 - Bounding Away
1985 - Rory's Jester
1984 - Inspired
1983 - Sir Dapper
1982 - Marscay
1981 - Full On Aces
1980 - Dark Eclipse
1979 - Century Miss
1978 - Manikato
1977 - Luskin Star
1976 - Vivarchi
1975 - Toy Show
1974 - Hartshill
1973 - Tontonan
1972 - John's Hope
1971 - Fairy Walk
1970 - Baguette
1969 - Vain
1968 - Royal Parma
1967 - Sweet Embrace
1966 - Storm Queen
1965 - Reisling
1964 - Eskimo Prince
1963† - Pago Pago 
1962 - Birthday Card 
1961 - Magic Night 
1960 - Sky High
1959 - Fine And Dandy
1958 - Skyline
1957 - Todman
 

† Initially scheduled for 23 March 1963 but the meeting was abandoned due to wet track conditions. Race was held 27 March 1963

See also
 List of Australian Group races
 Group races

External links
 Golden Slipper Stakes (ATC)

References

Group 1 stakes races in Australia
Flat horse races for two-year-olds
Sports competitions in Sydney